{{Infobox football club
| clubname = Huércal-Overa
| image = Huércal-Overa CF.png
| upright = 0.65
| fullname = Huércal-Overa Club de Fútbol
| nickname = 
| founded = 2008
| ground = El HornilloHuércal-Overa, Almería, Spain
| capacity = 2,000
| chairman =  Salvador Parra Molina
| manager =  Sebastián López Gómez
| league = 3ª RFEF – Group 13
| season = 2020–21
| position = 3ª – Group 13 (B), 8th of 113ª – Group 13 (E), 4th of 10 | pattern_la1 = 
| pattern_b1 = 
| pattern_ra1 = 
| pattern_sh1 = 
| leftarm1 = E30013
| body1 = E30013
| rightarm1 = E30013
| shorts1 = 000000
| socks1 = 000000
| pattern_la2 = 
| pattern_b2 = 
| pattern_ra2 = 
| pattern_sh2 = 
| leftarm2 = FFFFFF
| body2 = FFFFFF
| rightarm2 = FFFFFF
| shorts2 = FFFFFFF
| socks2 = FFFFFF|
}}Huércal-Overa Club de Fútbol is a Spanish football Club based in Huércal-Overa, and plays in Tercera División – Group 13, holding home games at El Hornillo, with a capacity of 2,000 (785 seated).

The club was initially formed on 1 July 1944 but in 2006 experienced financial difficulties and had to disband. The club then reformed in 2008 and since then have achieved three promotions.

 Season to season9 seasons in Tercera División1''' season in Tercera División RFEF

References

External links
Huércal-Overa C.F. blog
Club Website

Football clubs in Andalusia
Association football clubs established in 2008
2008 establishments in Spain